The Honkers is a 1972 American Comedy Western filmdirected by Steve Ihnat and written by Steve Ihnat and Stephen Lodge. The film stars James Coburn, Lois Nettleton, Slim Pickens, Anne Archer, Richard Anderson and Joan Huntington. The film was shot in Carlsbad, New Mexico and released on May 17, 1972, by United Artists.

Plot
An aging rodeo rider thinks more of himself than he does of his wife, son, and best friend.

Cast
James Coburn as Lew Lathrop
Lois Nettleton as Linda Lathrop
Slim Pickens as Clete
Anne Archer as Deborah Moon
Richard Anderson as Royce Owens
Joan Huntington as Rita Ferguson
Jim Davis as Sheriff Potter
Ramon Bieri as Jack Ferguson
Teddy Eccles as Bobby Lathrop
Mitchell Ryan as Lowell
Wayne McLaren as Everett
John Harmon as Sam Martin
Richard O'Brien as Matt Weber
Pitt Herbert as Haberdasher
Luther Elmore
Chuck Parkison Jr. as Announcer
Larry Mahan as Himself

See also
 List of American films of 1972

References

External links
 
 
 

1972 films
United Artists films
1970s Western (genre) comedy films
1972 comedy films
1972 Western (genre) films
American Western (genre) comedy films
Rodeo in film
Films scored by Jimmie Haskell
1970s English-language films
1970s American films